Kim Myung-Kun (born 23 March 1970) is a South Korean modern pentathlete. He competed at the 1988 and 1992 Summer Olympics.

References

1970 births
Living people
South Korean male modern pentathletes
Olympic modern pentathletes of South Korea
Modern pentathletes at the 1988 Summer Olympics
Modern pentathletes at the 1992 Summer Olympics
Asian Games medalists in modern pentathlon
Modern pentathletes at the 1994 Asian Games
Asian Games gold medalists for South Korea
Asian Games silver medalists for South Korea
Medalists at the 1994 Asian Games